Leilani Reklai (born December 27, 1966) is a Palauan politician and businesswoman. She has served as the chairperson of the board of directors of the Palau National Communications Corporation.

Leilani Reklai was tentatively elected the governor of the state of Aimeliik in the state elections of November 13, 2007. Early results showed Reklai leading her opponent (and cousin), Abina Etpison, by just 35 votes. Reklai had 218 votes while Etpison, a Palauan legislator, had 183 votes. A total of 468 were cast in the Aimeliik election. 58 absentee ballots were still to be counted to determine the winner.

Leilani Reklai became the first female governor of Aimeliik and only the third female governor in Palau's history. Palau's other two women governors were Governor Vicky Kanai of Airai State and Governor Akiko Sugiyama of Ngardmau.

Notes and references

External links
Pacific Magazine
Palau National Communications Corporation Board of Directors 

1966 births
Living people
People from Aimeliik
Palauan businesspeople
21st-century Palauan women politicians
21st-century Palauan politicians